The 2011 Men's Ice Hockey World Championships was the 75th such event hosted by the International Ice Hockey Federation. Teams representing 46 countries participated in four levels of competition. The competition also served as qualifications for division placements in the 2012 competition. Finland won the championship with a 6–1 win in the final game against Sweden.

Championship 

The Championship took place between sixteen teams from 29 April to 15 May 2011. Slovakia hosted the event with games being played in Bratislava and Košice.

Championship – Final Standings

Division I 

Division I competition took place 17 to 23 April 2011. Group A games were played in Budapest, Hungary and Group B was played in Kyiv, Ukraine. Prior to the start of the tournament the Japanese national team announced they would withdraw, citing the recent earthquake and tsunami. The IIHF council voted unanimously to allow Japan to maintain their seeded position in their respective tournaments for 2012, and the fifth placed team would be relegated.

Group A – Final Standings
  – promoted to Championship for 2012
 
 
 
  – relegated to Division II for 2012
  (withdrew from tournament)

Group B – Final Standings
  – promoted to Championship for 2012
 
 
 
 
  – relegated to Division II for 2012

Division II 

Participants in Division II tournament were in two separate tournament groups. The Group A tournament was contested in Melbourne, Australia, from 4 to 10 April 2011. Group B's games were played in Zagreb, Croatia, from 10 to 16 April 2011. Prior to the start of the tournament, the North Korean national team announced they would withdraw, citing financial reasons. All games against them were counted as a forfeit, with a score of 5–0 for the opposing team.

Group A – Final Standings
  – promoted to Division I for 2012
 
 
 
 
  – relegated to Division III for 2012 (withdrew from tournament)

Group B – Final Standings
  – promoted to Division I for 2012
 
 
 
 
  – relegated to Division III for 2012

Division III 

Division III was held from 11 to 17 April 2011. This tournament was contested in Cape Town, South Africa. Prior to the start of the tournament, the Mongolian national team announced they would withdraw, citing financial reasons. All games against them were counted as a forfeit, with a score of 5–0 for the opposing team. Israel won all five of its games by a combined score of 57–9, and was promoted to the 2012 IIHF World Championship Division II.

Division III – Final Standings
  – promoted to Division II for 2012
  – promoted to Division II for 2012
 
 
 
  (withdrew from tournament)

See also 
 2011 World Junior Ice Hockey Championships
 2011 IIHF World U18 Championships

References

External links 
 International Ice Hockey Federation
 hokejportal.cz – News service from World Ice Hockey Championships 2011 in Slovakia
 2011 IIHF World Championship Website

2011
 
2011 in ice hockey